Psappha may refer to:

Sappho (c. 630–c. 570 BCE), Greek poet
Psappha (Xenakis), a 1975 composition for solo percussion by Iannis Xenakis, named after the poet
Psappha New Music Ensemble, a contemporary music ensemble, named after the Xenakis composition

See also
Sappho (disambiguation)